Dakota Dunes may refer to:
 Dakota Dunes, South Dakota, a community in the United States
 Dakota Dunes Casino (or the associated Dakota Dunes Links Golf Course) in Saskatchewan, Canada